Skellyville is an unincorporated community in Kingman County, Kansas, United States.

History
Skellyville was formed as an "oil town" when oil was discovered in the area.  As the pocket of oil dried up, the population decreased as well.

Education
The community is served by Cunningham–West Kingman County USD 332 public school district.

References

Further reading

External links
 Kingman County maps: Current, Historic, KDOT

Populated places in Kingman County, Kansas